The Miami Marlins' 2019 season was the 27th season for the Major League Baseball (MLB) franchise in the National League and the 8th as the "Miami" Marlins. The Marlins played their home games at Marlins Park as members of the National League East Division. They were unable to improve upon their record from the previous season, finished with the second worst record in the history of the franchise at 57-105, and were eliminated from the postseason for the sixteenth straight year. One highlight of their season was winning a season series over the Philadelphia Phillies for the first time since 2008, and sweeping them in a home series for the first time since 2009. They only won two other season series within the NL, against the Padres and Diamondbacks.

Regular season

Season standings

Record vs. opponents

Game log

|-style="background:#fbb;"
| 1
| March 28
| Rockies
| 3–6
| Freeland (1–0)
| Ureña (0–1)
| —
| 25,423
| 0–1
| L1
|-style="background:#fbb;"
| 2
| March 29
| Rockies
| 1–6
| Marquez (1–0)
| Conley (0–1)
| —
| 6,503
| 0–2
| L2
|-style="background:#bfb;"
| 3
| March 30
| Rockies
| 7–3
| López (1–0)
| Anderson (0–1)
| —
| 7,642
| 1–2
| W1
|-style="background:#bfb;"
| 4
| March 31
| Rockies
| 3–0
| Alcántara (1–0)
| Gray (0–1)
| Romo (1)
| 7,559
| 2–2
| W2
|-style="background:#fbb;"
| 5
| April 1
| Mets
| 3–7
| Familia (1–0)
| Steckenrider (0–1)
| —
| 6,489
| 2–3
| L1
|-style="background:#fbb;"
| 6
| April 2
| Mets
| 5–6
| Vargas (1–0)
| Ureña (0–2)
| Wilson (1)
| 5,934
| 2–4
| L2
|-style="background:#fbb;"
| 7
| April 3
| Mets
| 4–6
| deGrom (2–0)
| Richards (0–1)
| Díaz (3)
| 7,486
| 2–5
| L3
|-style="background:#fbb;
| 8
| April 5
| @ Braves
| 0–4
| Gausman (1–0)
| López (1–1)
| —
| 29,218
| 2–6
| L4
|-style="background:#bfb;"
| 9
| April 6
| @ Braves
| 4–2
| Romo (1–0)
| Minter (0–1)
| Conley (1)
| 35,618
| 3–6
| W1
|-style="background:#fbb;"
| 10
| April 7
| @ Braves
| 3–4
| Vizcaíno (1–0)
| Conley (0–2)
| —
| 32,551
| 3–7
|L1
|-style="background:#fbb;"
| 11
| April 9
| @ Reds
| 0–14
| Castillo (1–1)
| Ureña (0–3)
| —
| 10,058
| 3–8
| L2
|-style="background:#fbb;"
| 12
| April 10
| @ Reds
| 1–2
| Garrett (1–0)
| Steckenrider (0–2)
| Iglesias (1)
| 11,375
| 3–9
| L3
|-style="background:#fbb;"
| 13
| April 11
| @ Reds
| 0–5
| Stephenson (1–0)
| López (1–2)
| —
| 11,192
| 3–10
| L4
|-style="background:#fbb;"
| 14
| April 12
| Phillies
| 1–9
| Arrieta (2–1)
| Alcántara (1–1)
| —
| 9,322
| 3–11
| L5
|-style="background:#bfb;"
| 15
| April 13
| Phillies
| 10–3
| Smith (1–0)
| Eflin (2–1)
| —
| 13,828
| 4–11
| W1
|-style="background:#fbb;"
| 16
| April 14
| Phillies
| 1–3 (14)
| Arano (1–0)
| Chen (0–1)
| Álvarez (1)
| 15,238
| 4–12
| L1
|-style="background:#fbb;"
| 17
| April 15
| Cubs
| 2–7
| Darvish (1–2)
| Richards (0–2)
| —
| 9,888
| 4–13
| L2
|-style="background:#fbb;"
| 18
| April 16
| Cubs
| 0–4
| Quintana (2–1)
| López (1–3)
| —
| 8,137
| 4–14
| L3
|-style="background:#fbb;"
| 19
| April 17
| Cubs
| 0–6
| Hamels (3–0)
| Alcántara (1–2)
| —
| 10,247
| 4–15
| L4
|-
|-style="background:#bfb;"
| 20
| April 19
| Nationals
| 3–2
| Smith (2–0)
| Sánchez (0–2)
| Romo (2)
| 8,199
| 5–15
| W1
|-style="background:#bfb;"
| 21
| April 20
| Nationals
| 9–3
| Ureña (1–3)
| Scherzer (1–3)
| —
| 9,910
| 6–15
| W2
|-style="background:#fbb;"
| 22
| April 21
| Nationals
| 0–5
| Strasburg (2–1)
| Richards (0–3)
| —
| 7,412
| 6–16
| L1
|-style="background:#bfb;"
| 23
| April 23
| @ Indians
| 3–1
| López (2–3)
| Ramírez (0–1)
| Romo (3)
| 12,963
| 7–16
| W1
|-style="background:#fbb;"
| 24
| April 24
| @ Indians
| 2–6
| Wittgren (1–0)
| Conley (0–3)
| —
| 13,046
| 7–17
| L1
|-style="background:#bfb;"
| 25
| April 25
| @ Phillies
| 3–1 (10)
| Guerrero (1–0)
| Neris (0–1)
| Romo (4)
| 32,060
| 8–17
| W1
|-style="background:#fbb;"
| 26
| April 26
| @ Phillies
| 0–4
| Eickhoff (1–1)
| Ureña (1–4)
| —
| 31,159
| 8–18
| L1
|-style="background:#fbb;"
| 27
| April 27
| @ Phillies
| 9–12
| Arrieta (4–2)
| Richards (0–4)
| Neris (4)
| 37,868
| 8–19
| L2
|-style="background:#fbb;"
| 28
| April 28
| @ Phillies
| 1–5
| Eflin (3–3)
| López (2–4)
| —
| 39,168
| 8–20
| L3
|-style="background:#fbb;"
| 29
| April 30
| Indians
| 4–7
| Bauer (4–1)
| Alcántara (1–3)
| Hand (9)
| 7,247
| 8–21
| L4
|-

|-style="background:#bfb;"
| 30
| May 1
| Indians
| 4–2
| Smith (3–0)
| Kluber (2–3)
| Romo (5)
| 7,262
| 9–21
| W1
|-style="background:#fbb;"
| 31
| May 3
| Braves
| 2–7
| Toussaint (2–0)
| Ureña (1–5)
| —
| 7,198
| 9–22
| L1
|-style="background:#fbb;"
| 32
| May 4
| Braves
| 2–9
| Soroka (3–1)
| Anderson (0–1)
| —
| 10,229
| 9–23
| L2
|-style="background:#fbb;"
| 33
| May 5
| Braves
| 1–3 (10)
| Tomlin (1–0)
| Guerrero (1–1)
| Jackson (2)
| 11,885
| 9–24
| L3
|-style="background:#bfb;"
| 34
| May 6
| @ Cubs
| 6–5
| Conley (1–3)
| Strop (1–2)
| Romo (6)
| 34,555
| 10–24
| W1
|-style="background:#fbb;"
| 35
| May 7
| @ Cubs
| 2–5
| Cishek (1–1)
| Conley (1–4)
| —
| 35,274
| 10–25
| L1
|-style="background:#fbb;"
| 36
| May 8
| @ Cubs
| 2–3 (11)
| Edwards Jr. (1–1)
| Quijada (0–1)
| —
| 37,241
| 10–26
| L2
|-style="background:#fbb;"
| 37
| May 9
| @ Cubs
| 1–4
| Montgomery (1–0)
| Richards (0–5)
| —
| 32,301
| 10–27
| L3
|-style="background:#fbb;"
| 38
| May 10
| @ Mets
| 2–11
| Wheeler (3–2)
| López (2–5)
| —
| 25,194
| 10–28
| L4
|-style="background:#fbb;"
| 39
| May 11
| @ Mets
| 1–4
| deGrom (3–4)
| Alcántara (1–4)
| Díaz (10)
| 32,501
| 10–29
| L5
|-style="background:#bbb;"
| —
| May 12
| @ Mets
| colspan="7"|Postponed (Inclement weather) (Makeup date: August 5)
|-style="background:#fbb;"
| 40
| May 14
| Rays
| 0–4
| Morton (4–0)
| Smith (3–1)
| —
| 6,306
| 10–30
| L6
|-style="background:#fbb;"
| 41
| May 15
| Rays
| 0–1
| Beeks (3–0)
| Ureña (1–6)
| Castillo (3)
| 5,947
| 10–31
| L7
|-style="background:#bfb;"
| 42
| May 17
| Mets
| 8–6
| Richards (1–5)
| deGrom (3–5)
| Romo (7)
| 9,870
| 11–31
| W1
|-style="background:#bfb;"
| 43
| May 18
| Mets
| 2–0
| López (3–5)
| Matz (3–3)
| Conley (2)
| 13,474
| 12–31
| W2
|-style="background:#bfb;"
| 44
| May 19
| Mets
| 3–0
| Alcántara (2–4)
| Syndergaard (3–4)
| —
| 15,983
| 13–31
| W3
|-style="background:#bfb;"
| 45
| May 21
| @ Tigers
| 5–4 (11)
| Anderson (1–1)
| Jiménez (2–2)
| —
| 15,565
| 14–31
| W4
|-style="background:#bfb;"
| 46
| May 22
| @ Tigers
| 6–3
| Ureña (2–6)
| Farmer (2–3)
| Romo (8)
| 14,506
| 15–31
| W5
|-style="background:#bfb;"
| 47
| May 23
| @ Tigers
| 5–2
| Kinley (1–0)
| Greene (0–2)
| Romo (9)
| 17,214
| 16–31
| W6
|-style="background:#fbb;"
| 48
| May 24
| @ Nationals
| 10–12
| Barraclough (1–1)
| Anderson (1–2)
| Doolittle (9)
| 29,173
| 16–32
| L1
|-style="background:#fbb;"
| 49
| May 25
| @ Nationals
| 0–5
| Corbin (5–2)
| Alcántara (2–5)
| —
| 33,163
| 16–33
| L2
|-style="background:#fbb;"
| 50
| May 26
| @ Nationals
| 5–9
| Fedde (1–0)
| Smith (3–2)
| —
| 26,365
| 16–34
| L3
|-style="background:#bfb;"
| 51
| May 27
| @ Nationals
| 3–2
| Ureña (3–6)
| Barraclough (1–2)
| Romo (10)
| 21,048
| 17–34
| W1
|-style="background:#bfb;"
| 52
| May 28
| Giants
| 11–3
| Richards (2–5)
| Samardzija (2–4)
| —
| 6,407
| 18–34
| W2
|-style="background:#bfb;"
| 53
| May 29
| Giants
| 4–2
| Anderson (2–2)
| Bumgarner (3–5)
| Romo (11)
| 6,487
| 19–34
| W3
|-style="background:#fbb;"
| 54
| May 30
| Giants
| 1–3
| Moronta (2–4)
| Conley (1–5)
| Smith (13)
| 7,371
| 19–35
| L1
|-style="background:#fbb;"
| 55
| May 31
| @ Padres
| 2–5
| Lucchesi (4–3)
| Smith (3–3)
| Yates (22)
| 25,019
| 19–36
| L2
|-

|-style="background:#bfb;"
| 56
| June 1
| @ Padres
| 9–3 
| Ureña (4–6)
| Margevicius (2–6)
| —
| 26,858
| 20–36
| W1
|-style="background:#bfb;"
| 57
| June 2
| @ Padres
| 9–3
| Richards (3–5)
| Strahm (2–5)
| —
| 31,650
| 21–36
| W2
|-style="background:#bfb;"
| 58
| June 4
| @ Brewers
| 16–0
| López (4–5)
| Anderson (3–1)
| —
| 25,364
| 22–36
| W3
|-style="background:#bfb;"
| 59
| June 5
| @ Brewers
| 8–3
| Alcántara (3–5)
| Nelson (0–1)
| —
| 26,615
| 23–36
| W4
|-style="background:#fbb;"
| 60
| June 6
| @ Brewers
| 1–5
| Peralta (3–2)
| Smith (3–4)
| Hader (14)
| 25,409
| 23–37
| L1
|-style="background:#fbb;"
| 61
| June 7
| Braves
| 1–7
| Soroka (7–1)
| Ureña (4–7)
| —
| 8,589
| 23–38
| L2
|-style="background:#fbb;"
| 62
| June 8
| Braves
| 0–1
| Teherán (4–4)
| Richards (3–6)
| Jackson (9)
| 9,771
| 23–39
| L3
|-style="background:#fbb;"
| 63
| June 9
| Braves
| 6–7 (12)
| Winkler (3–1)
| Conley (1–6)
| Tomlin (1)
| 10,959
| 23–40
| L4
|-style="background:#fbb;"
| 64
| June 10
| Cardinals
| 1–4
| Wacha (4–2)
| Alcántara (3–6)
| Hicks (13)
| 6,585
| 23–41
| L5
|-style="background:#fbb;"
| 65
| June 11
| Cardinals
| 1–7
| Hudson (5–3)
| Hernández (0–1)
| —
| 6,308
| 23–42
| L6
|-style="background:#bfb;"
| 66
| June 12
| Cardinals
| 9–0
| Yamamoto (1–0)
| Mikolas (4–7)
| —
| 7,001
| 24–42
| W1
|-style="background:#fbb;"
| 67
| June 14
| Pirates
| 0–11
| Brault (3–1)
| Richards (3–7)
| —
| 8,340
| 24–43
| L1
|-style="background:#bfb;"
| 68
| June 15
| Pirates
| 4–3
| López (5–5) 
| Hartlieb (0–1)
| Romo (12)
| 11,464
| 25–43
| W1
|-style="background:#fbb;"
| 69
| June 16
| Pirates
| 4–5
| Rodríguez (1–3)
| Anderson (2–3)
| Vázquez (16)
| 12,472
| 25–44
| L1
|-style="background:#fbb;
| 70
| June 17
| @ Cardinals
| 0–5
| Mikolas (5–7)
| Hernández (0–2)
| —
| 41,274
| 25–45
| L2
|-style="background:#bfb;"
| 71
| June 18
| @ Cardinals
| 6–0
| Yamamoto (2–0)
| Flaherty (4–4)
| —
| 41,467
| 26–45
| W1
|-style="background:#fbb;"
| 72
| June 19
| @ Cardinals
| 1–2 
| Gant (7–0)
| Conley (1–7)
| —
| 40,126
| 26–46
| L1
|-style="background:#bfb;"
| 73
| June 20
| @ Cardinals
| 7–6 
| García (1–0)
| Miller (3–3)
| Romo (13)
| 42,446
| 27–46
| W1
|-style="background:#bfb;"
| 74
| June 21
| @ Phillies
| 2–1
| Alcántara (4–6)
| Nola (6–2)
| Romo (14)
| 44,420
| 28–46
| W2
|-style="background:#bfb;"
| 75
| June 22
| @ Phillies
| 5–3 
| Brice (1–0)
| Morgan (2–2)
| Quijada (1)
| 44,722
| 29–46
| W3
|-style="background:#bfb;"
| 76
| June 23
| @ Phillies
| 6–4
| Yamamoto (3–0)
| De Los Santos (0–1)
| Anderson (1)
| 36,749
| 30–46
| W4
|-style="background:#fbb;"
| 77
| June 25
| Nationals
| 1–6
| Scherzer (7–5)
| Richards (3–8)
| —
| 7,327
| 30–47
| L1
|-style="background:#fbb;"
| 78
| June 26
| Nationals
| 5–7
| Corbin (7–5)
| Gallen (0–1)
| Doolittle (17)
| 6,276
| 30–48
| L2
|-style="background:#fbb;"
| 79
| June 27
| Nationals
| 5–8
| Strasburg (9–4)
| Alcántara (4–7)
| —
| 7.751
| 30–49
| L3
|-style="background:#bfb;"
| 80
| June 28
| Phillies
| 6–2
| Hernández (1–2)
| Velasquez (2–5)
| —
| 9,469
| 31–49
| W1
|-style="background:#bfb;"
| 81
| June 29
| Phillies
| 9–6
| García (2–0)
| Morgan (2–3)
| Romo (15)
| 14,774
| 32–49
| W2
|-style="background:#fbb;"
| 82
| June 30
| Phillies
| 6–13
| Arrieta (8–6)
| Richards (3–9)
| —
| 11,742
| 32–50
| L1
|-

|-style="background:#fbb;"
| 83
| July 2
| @ Nationals
| 2–3
| Doolittle (5–2)
| Quijada (0–2)
| —
| 21,361
| 32–51
| L2
|-style="background:#fbb;"
| 84
| July 3
| @ Nationals
| 1–3
| Strasburg (10–4)
| Alcántara (4–8)
| Doolittle (19)
| 25,483
| 32–52
| L3
|-style="background:#fbb;"
| 85
| July 4
| @ Nationals
| 2–5
| Sánchez (5–6)
| Hernández (1–3)
| Rodney (2)
| 27,350
| 32–53
| L4
|-style="background:#fbb;"
| 86
| July 5
| @ Braves
| 0–1
| Jackson (4–2)
| Quijada (0–3)
| —
| 41,102
| 32–54
| L5
|-style="background:#bfb;"
| 87
| July 6
| @ Braves
| 5–4
| Smith (4–4)
| Fried (9–4)
| Romo (16)
| 37,216
| 33–54
| W1
|-style="background:#fbb;"
| 88
| July 7
| @ Braves
| 3–4
| Keuchel (2–2)
| Richards (3–10)
| Jackson (14)
| 30,514
| 33–55
| L1
|-style="background:#bfb;"
| 89
| July 12
| Mets
| 8–4
| Smith (5–4)
| Vargas (3–5)
| —
| 11,856
| 34–55
| W1
|-style="background:#fbb;"
| 90
| July 13
| Mets
| 2–4
| Syndergaard (7–4)
| Anderson (2–4)
| Díaz (20)
| 12,963
| 34–56
| L1
|-style="background:#fbb;"
| 91
| July 14
| Mets
| 2–6
| deGrom (5–7)
| Alcántara (4–9)
| —
| 14,780
| 34–57
| L2
|-style="background:#bfb;"
| 92
| July 16
| Padres
| 12–7
| Yamamoto (4–0)
| Allen (2–2)
| —
| 8,151
| 35–57
| W1
|-style="background:#fbb;"
| 93
| July 17
| Padres
| 2–3
| Paddack (6–4)
| Richards (3–11)
| Yates (31)
| 7,818
| 35–58
| L1
|-style="background:#bfb;"
| 94
| July 18
| Padres
| 4–3
| Romo (2–0)
| Wingenter (1–3)
| —
| 21,149
| 36–58
| W1
|-style="background:#fbb;"
| 95
| July 19
| @ Dodgers
| 1–2
| Ryu (11–2)
| Gallen (0–2)
| Jansen (24)
| 52,471
| 36–59
| L1
|-style="background:#fbb;"
| 96
| July 20
| @ Dodgers
| 6–10
| Báez (5–2)
| Hernández (1–4)
| —
| 53,778
| 36–60
| L2
|-style="background:#fbb;"
| 97
| July 21
| @ Dodgers
| 0–9
| Buehler (9–1)
| Yamamoto (4–1)
| —
| 47,469
| 36–61
| L3
|-style="background:#fbb;"
| 98
| July 22
| @ White Sox
| 1–9
| Nova (5–9)
| Richards (3–12)
| —
| 14,471
| 36–62
| L4
|-style="background:#bfb;"
| 99
| July 23
| @ White Sox
| 5–1
| Smith (6–4)
| Covey (1–6)
| —
| 14,043
| 37–62
| W1
|-style="background:#bfb;"
| 100
| July 24
| @ White Sox
| 2–0
| Gallen (1–2)
| López (5–9)
| Romo (17)
| 19,098
| 38–62
| W2
|-style="background:#bfb;"
| 101
| July 26
| Diamondbacks
| 3–2
| Quijada (1–3)
| Holland (1–2)
| —
| 8,867
| 39–62
| W3
|-style="background:#fbb;"
| 102
| July 27
| Diamondbacks
| 2–9
| Young (4–0)
| Yamamoto (4–2)
| —
| 13,047
| 39–63
| L1
|-style="background:#bfb;"
| 103
| July 28
| Diamondbacks
| 5–1
| Quijada (2–3)
| Ray (9–7)
| —
| 11,538
| 40–63
| W1
|-style="background:#bfb;"
| 104
| July 29
| Diamondbacks
| 11–6
| Smith (7–4)
| Kelly (7–11)
| —
| 7,048
| 41–63
| W2
|-style="background:#fbb;"
| 105
| July 30
| Twins
| 1–2
| Odorizzi (12–5)
| Gallen (1–3)
| Rogers (16)
| 8,064
| 41–64
| L1
|-style="background:#fbb;"
| 106
| July 31
| Twins
| 4–7
| Berríos (10–5)
| Alcántara (4–10)
| —
| 8,567
| 41–65
| L2
|-

|-style="background:#bfb;"
| 107
| August 1
| Twins
| 5–4 (12)
| Brigham (1–0)
| Stashak (0–1)
| —
| 10,390
| 42–65
| W1
|-style="background:#fbb;"
| 108
| August 3
| @ Rays
| 6–8
| Anderson (3–4)
| García (1–2)
| Pagán (9)
| 14,092
| 42–66
| L1
|-style="background:#fbb;"
| 109
| August 4
| @ Rays
| 2–7
| Chirinos (9–5)
| Smith (7–5)
| —
| 14,819
| 42–67
| L2
|-style=background:#fbb;"
| 110
| August 5
| @ Mets
| 2–6
| deGrom (7–7)
| Dugger (0–1)
| —
| N/A
| 42–68
| L3
|-style="background:#fbb;"
| 111
| August 5
| @ Mets
| 4–5
| Familia (3–1)
| Brigham (1–1)
| Lugo (2)
| 29,645
| 42–69
| L4
|-style="background:#fbb;"
| 112
| August 6
| @ Mets
| 0–5
| Wheeler (9–6)
| Noesí (0–1)
| —
| 27,479
| 42–70
| L5
|-style="background:#fbb;"
| 113
| August 7
| @ Mets
| 2–7
| Matz (7–7)
| Yamamoto (4–3)
| —
| 26,349
| 42–71
| L6
|-style="background:#bfb;"
| 114
| August 8
| Braves
| 9–2
| Hernández (2–4)
| Keuchel (3–5)
| —
| 8,948
| 43–71
| W1
|-style="background:#fbb;"
| 115
| August 9
| Braves
| 4–8
| Teherán (7–7)
| Smith (7–6)
| —
| 8,057
| 43–72
| L1
|-style="background:#bfb;"
| 116
| August 10
| Braves
| 7–6 
| Brigham (2–1)
| Newcomb (5–2)
| —
| 29,720
| 44–72
| W1
|-style="background:#fbb;"
| 117
| August 11
| Braves
| 4–5
| Foltynewicz (4–5)
| Noesí (0–2)
| Jackson (18)
| 12,338
| 44–73
| L1
|-style="background:#fbb;"
| 118
| August 13
| Dodgers
| 1–15
| May (1–1)
| Yamamoto (4–4)
| —
| 8,729
| 44–74
| L2
|-style="background:#fbb;"
| 119
| August 14
| Dodgers
| 1–9
| Kershaw (12–2)
| Hernández (2–5)
| —
| 8,810
| 44–75
| L3
|-style="background:#bfb;"
| 120
| August 15
| Dodgers
| 13–7
| Smith (8–6)
| Buehler (10–3)
| —
| 8,471
| 45–75
| W1
|-style="background:#fbb;"
| 121
| August 16
| @ Rockies
| 0–3
| Gray (11–8)
| Alcántara (4–11)
| Oberg (5)
| 35,018
| 45–76
| L1
|-style="background:#fbb;"
| 122
| August 17
| @ Rockies
| 4–11
| Márquez (12–5)
| Noesí (0–3)
| —
| 40,199
| 45–77
| L2
|-style="background:#fbb;"
| 123
| August 18
| @ Rockies
| 6–7 
| Estévez (2–2)
| Brigham (2–2)
| —
| 38,181
| 45–78
| L3
|-style="background:#fbb;"
| 124
| August 20
| @ Braves
| 1–5
| Keuchel (4–5)
| Kinley (1–1)
| —
| 21,271
| 45–79
| L4
|-style="background:#fbb;"
| 125
| August 21
| @ Braves
| 0–5
| Teherán (8–8)
| Smith (8–7)
| —
| 23,537
| 45–80
| L5
|-style="background:#fbb;"
| 126
| August 22
| @ Braves
| 2–3
| Melancon (5–2)
| Stanek (0–3)
| —
| 23,967
| 45–81
| L6
|-style="background:#bfb;"
| 127
| August 23
| Phillies
| 19–11
| Kinley (2–1)
| Pivetta (4–6)
| —
| 9,065
| 46–81
| W1
|-style="background:#fbb;"
| 128
| August 24
| Phillies
| 3–9
| Eflin (8–11)
| Yamamoto (4–5)
| —
| 12,981
| 46–82
| L1
|-style="background:#bfb;"
| 129
| August 25
| Phillies
| 3–2
| Hernández (3–5)
| Nola (12–4)
| Stanek (1)
| 9,286
| 47–82
| W1
|-style="background:#fbb;"
| 130
| August 26
| Reds
| 3–6
| Gray (10–6)
| López (5–6)
| —
| 5,297
| 47–83
| L1
|-style="background:#fbb;"
| 131
| August 27
| Reds
| 5–8
| Castillo (13–5)
| Smith (8–8)
| Iglesias (27)
| 6,169
| 47–84
| L2
|-style="background:#fbb;"
| 132
| August 28
| Reds
| 0–5
| DeSclafani (9–7)
| Alcántara (4–12)
| —
| 6,409
| 47–85
| L3
|-style="background:#bfb;"
| 133
| August 29
| Reds
| 4–3 
| Kinley (3–1)
| Iglesias (2–10)
| —
| 6,466
| 48–85
| W1
|-style="background:#fbb;"
| 134
| August 30
| @ Nationals
| 6–7
| Hudson (8–3)
| Stanek (0–4)
| —
| 26,201
| 48–86
| L1
|-style="background:#fbb;"
| 135
| August 31
| @ Nationals
| 0–7
| Strasburg (16–5)
| López (5–7)
| —
| 27,539
| 48–87
| L2
|-

|-style="background:#fbb;"
| 136
| September 1
| @ Nationals
| 3–9
| Corbin (11–6)
| Smith (8–9)
| —
| 29,345 
| 48–88
| L3
|-style="background:#bfb;"
| 137
| September 3
| @ Pirates
| 5–4  
| Conley (2–7) 
| Markel (0–1)
| Ureña (1)
| 9,169
| 49–88
| W1
|-style="background:#fbb;"
| 138
| September 4
| @ Pirates
| 5–6
| Wang (2–0)
| Ureña (4–8)
| —
| 9,043
| 49–89
| L1
|-style="background:#bfb;"
| 139
| September 5
| @ Pirates
| 10–7
| Moran (1–0)
| Agrazal (4–4)
| —
| 9,642
| 50–89
| W1
|-style="background:#fbb;"
| 140
| September 6
| Royals
| 0–3
| López (3–7)
| López (5–8)
| Kennedy (27)
| 8,915
| 50–90
| L1
|-style="background:#fbb
| 141
| September 7
| Royals
| 2–7
| Duffy (6–6)
| Conley (2–8)
| Hill (1)
| 13,112
| 50–91
| L2
|-style="background:#bfb;"
| 142
| September 8
| Royals
| 9–0
| Alcántara (5–12)
| Montgomery (3–8)
| —
| 10,934
| 51–91
| W1
|-style="background:#fbb;"
| 143
| September 9
| Brewers
| 3–8
| Albers (6–5)
| Dugger (0–2)
| —
| 6,672
| 51–92
| L1
|-style="background:#fbb;"
| 144
| September 10
| Brewers
| 3–4
| Guerra (9–5)
| Conley (2–9)
| Pomeranz (1)
| 7,215
| 51–93
| L2
|-style="background:#fbb;"
| 145
| September 11
| Brewers
| 5–7
| Suter (2–0)
| Ureña (4–9)
| Hader (30)
| 7,815
| 51–94
| L3
|-style="background:#fbb;"
| 146
| September 12
| Brewers
| 2–3
| Peralta (6–3)
| Smith (8–10)
| Hader (31)
| 7,375
| 51–95
| L4
|-style="background:#fbb;"
| 147
| September 13
| @ Giants
| 0–1
| Beede (5–9)
| Alcántara (5–13)
| Anderson (2)
| 33,418
| 51–96
| L5
|-style="background:#bfb;"
| 148
| September 14
| @ Giants
| 4–2
| García (3–1)
| Anderson (3–5)
| Ureña (2)
| 38,663
| 52–96
| W1
|-style="background:#fbb;"
| 149
| September 15
| @ Giants
| 1–2
| Rogers (2–0)
| García (3–2)
| Smith (33)
| 39,663
| 52–97
| L1
|-style="background:#fbb;"
| 150
| September 16
| @ Diamondbacks
| 5–7
| Hirano (5–5)
| Guerrero (1–2)
| Ginkel (1)
| 15,897
| 52–98
| L2
|-style="background:#bfb;"
| 151
| September 17
| @ Diamondbacks
| 12–6
| Smith (9–10)
| Andriese (5–5)
| —
| 19,745
| 53–98
| W1
|-style="background:#fbb;"
| 152
| September 18
| @ Diamondbacks
| 4–5
| Leake (12–11)
| Alcantara (5–14)
| Bradley (15)
| 17,731
| 53–99
| L1
|-style="background:#fbb;"
| 153
| September 20
| Nationals
| 4–6
| Sánchez (10–8)
| Dugger (0–3)
| Hudson (5)
| 12,775
| 53–100
| L2
|-style="background:#fbb;"
| 154
| September 21
| Nationals
| 4–10 (10)
| Suero (6–8)
| Ureña (4–10)
| —
| 18,085
| 53–101
| L3
|-style="background:#bfb;"
| 155
| September 22
| Nationals
| 5–3
| García (4–2)
| Suero (6–9)
| Brigham (1)
| 19,709
| 54–101
| L3
|-style="background:#bfb;"
| 156
| September 23
| @ Mets
| 8–4
| Smith (10–10)
| Matz (10–10)
| —
| 21,189
| 55–101
| W1
|-style="background:#fbb;"
| 157
| September 24
| @ Mets
| 4–5 
| Sewald (1–1)
| Conley (2–10)
| —
| 21,766
| 55–102
| L1
|-style="background:#fbb;"
| 158
| September 25
| @ Mets
| 3–10
| deGrom (11–8)
| Dugger (0–4)
| —
| 21,471
| 55–103
| L2
|-style="background:#bfb;"
| 159
| September 26
| @ Mets
| 4–2
| Brigham (3–2)
| Wheeler (11–8)
| Ureña (3)
| 21,729
| 56–103
| W1
|-style="background:#fbb;"
| 160
| September 27
| @ Phillies
| 4–5 
| Suárez (6–1)
| Conley (2–11)
| —
| 24,143
| 56–104
| L1
|-style="background:#fbb;"
| 161
| September 28
| @ Phillies
| 3–9
| Eflin (10–13)
| Smith (10–11)
| —
| 25,156
| 56–105
| L2
|-style="background:#bfb;"
| 162
| September 29
| @ Phillies
| 4–3
| Alcántara (6–14)
| Parker (3–3)
| Kinley (1)
| 31,805
| 57–105
| W1
|-

|-
| Legend:       = Win       = Loss       = PostponementBold = Marlins team member

Roster

Farm system

See also

References

External links
2019 Miami Marlins season at Baseball Reference

Miami Marlins season
Miami Marlins
Miami Marlins seasons